Sarah-Marine Rouffanche (born 22 July 1997) is a French ice dancer. With her skating partner, Geoffrey Brissaud, she competed at the 2015 World Junior Championships in Tallinn, Estonia. They qualified for the free dance and finished 15th overall.

Programs 
(with Brissaud)

Competitive highlights 
With Brissaud

JGP: Junior Grand Prix

References

External links 
 
 

1997 births
French female ice dancers
Living people
Sportspeople from Limoges
21st-century French women